John Ewart (January 31, 1788 – September 18, 1856) was a Canadian architect and businessman.

He was born in Tranent Scotland in 1788. After completing his apprenticeship in building, he moved to London around 1811. In 1816, he emigrated to New York City and moved to York (Toronto) in Upper Canada a few years later. He built a hospital and then the town's first Roman Catholic church, St. Paul's. In 1818, he built the parliament building for Upper Canada at York. In 1824, he designed the courthouse and jail for the Home District and, in 1827–31, the two-story castellated-style courthouse for the London District, Ontario. He was one of the overseers for the construction of the new parliament building after the original building burned in 1824. In 1829, he prepared the design for the original Osgoode Hall; some remodelling and additions occurred later. He continued to operate a building yard and was a director on the boards of several institutions in the city after 1830, although he had retired as an architect.

His daughter, Jane, was wife of Sir Oliver Mowat, and his son, Thomas Ewart, was married to Catherine Seaton Skirving, a noted philanthropist.

He died in Toronto in 1856 of gangrene, brought on by arteriosclerosis.

Works

External links 
Biography at the Dictionary of Canadian Biography Online

References 

1788 births
1856 deaths
Canadian architects
People from Tranent